A monitor filter is an accessory to the computer display to filter out the light reflected from the smooth glass surface of a CRT or flat panel display. Many also include a ground to dissipate static buildup. A secondary use for monitor filters is privacy as they decrease the viewing angle of a monitor, preventing it from being viewed from the side; in this case, they are also called privacy screens.

The standard type of anti-glare filter consists of a coating that reduces the reflection from a glass or plastic surface. These are manufactured from polycarbonate or acrylic plastic. An older variety of anti-glare filter used a mesh filter that had the appearance of a nylon screen. Although effective, a mesh filter also caused degradation of the image quality.

Marketing names of privacy filters:
 HP's "SureView"
 Lenovo's "PrivacyGuard"
 Dell's "SafeScreen"

Support for privacy screen is available since Linux kernel 5.17 that expose it through Direct Rendering Manager and is used by GNOME 42.

References

Display technology
Ergonomics